Tamil Americans (தமிழ் அமெரிக்கர்கள்) are Americans who are of Tamil origin. The majority of Tamil Americans come from the Indian state of Tamil Nadu. Significant minorities are from other Indian states like Karnataka, Kerala, Andhra Pradesh, etc., as well as from other countries like Sri Lanka, Malaysia, and Singapore.

In 2000, the number of Tamil speakers in the US numbered approximately 50,000 individuals. By 2010 the number surged to 127,892 and grew to 238,699 by 2020. The growth of the Tamil population in the United States is attributed to the H-1B visa program, and the presence of a large number of Tamil students studying in American universities.

Demographics

In the second half of the 20th century, Tamils from India migrated as skilled professionals to the United States, Canada, Europe, and Southeast Asia. The Tamil American population exceeds 1,500,000 individuals. The Federation of Tamil Sangams of North America functions as an umbrella organization for the growing community.

Central New Jersey is home to the largest population concentration of Tamil Americans. Sizeable populations of Indian American Tamils have also settled in New York City, and New Jersey and New York house separate Tamil Sangams. The Washington, D.C. metropolitan area and the Research Triangle area on the East Coast as well as Silicon Valley on the West Coast also have Tamil associations.

The New York City and Los Angeles metropolitan areas are home to the largest concentrations of Tamil-speaking Sri Lankan Americans. New York City's Staten Island alone is estimated to be home to more than 5,000 Sri Lankan Americans, one of the largest Sri Lankan populations outside Sri Lanka itself, and a significant proportion of whom speak Tamil.

Language
The Indian Tamil community in the United States is largely bilingual. Tamil is taught in weekly classes in many Hindu temples and by associations such as the American Tamil Academy in South Brunswick, New Jersey and the Tamil Jersey School in Jersey City.

The language's written form is highly formal and quite distinct from the spoken form. A few universities, such as the University of Chicago and the University of California, Berkeley, have graduate programs in the language.

Religion 
The Indian Tamil community is majority-wise connected to the Hindu community. In most Hindu temples in the United States, the prayers are in Sanskrit. However, in North Brunswick, New Jersey, the "Tamil Temple" ("Tamil Annai Thirukkoyil") conducts all the prayers in the Tamil language. The Hindu Temple in Houston, Texas, is dedicated to Meenakshi, a manifestation of the goddess Parvathi.  There are also active Tamil Christian and Muslim minorities, as well as Jains and Buddhists. Tamil Muslims also hold a Tamil Muslim Community Sangam-Iman America/QMFUSA

Notable people

Academia
 Subrahmanyan Chandrasekhar – Astrophysicist and Nobel laureate
 Raj Chetty – Economist, professor of economics at Harvard University renowned for his research on equality of opportunity in the United States
 G. V. Loganathan – Professor and a victim of the Virginia Tech massacre
 C. Mohan – Computer scientist
 Sendhil Mullainathan – Economist, Harvard professor
 Sethuraman Panchanathan – Executive Vice President, Knowledge Enterprise Development and Chief Research Innovation Officer at Arizona State University
 Arogyaswami Paulraj – Wireless researcher, winner of Marconi Prize
 V. S. Ramachandran – Physician, neuroscientist, director of the Center for Brain and Cognition at the University of California, San Diego
 Venkatraman Ramakrishnan – Structural biologist and Nobel laureate
 Maya Shankar – Scientist
 Siva Sivananthan – Academic, scientist, businessman and Director of the Microphysics Laboratory at the University of Illinois at Chicago
 Subra Suresh - Former President of Carnegie Mellon University
 Stanley Jeyaraja Tambiah – Social anthropologist
 S. R. Srinivasa Varadhan – Mathematician
 Sudhir Venkatesh – Sociologist and urban ethnographer

Arts & Entertainment
 Ashok Amritraj – Indian-American film producer
 Aziz Ansari – Actor and stand-up comedian
 Sunkrish Bala – Actor
 Jay Chandrasekhar – Actor and director
 Vijay Iyer – Pianist
 Poorna Jagannathan – Actress and producer
 Clarence Jey – Record producer and songwriter
 Mindy Kaling – Actress
 Padma Lakshmi - Author, actress, model, television host
 Mary Anne Mohanraj – Writer
 Sendhil Ramamurthy - Film and television actor
 M. Night Shyamalan – Film director
 S. J. Sindu – Writer
 Rajan Somasundaram – Music composer, songwriter and multi instrumentalist
 Sid Sriram – Singer and producer
 Prashanth Venkataramanujam – Actor, television writer, and producer; head writer and producer of Patriot Act
 Divya Victor – Poet

Business
 Krishna Bharat – Computer scientist; founder of Google News
 Vasant Narasimhan - chief executive officer (CEO) of Novartis
 Indra Nooyi – chairwoman and former CEO of PepsiCo Incorporated
 Sundar Pichai - chief executive officer (CEO) of Google
 C. K. Prahalad – Late world-renowned management guru
 Raghuram Rajan – Economist, winner of Fischer Black Prize
 Ram Shriram – Billionaire venture capitalist
 Raj Rajaratnam – Founder of Galleon Group
 Chandrika Tandon – Businesswoman and artist

News & Journalism
 Sukanya Krishnan – News anchor
 Hari Sreenivasan – Broadcast journalist

Politics & Law
 Kamala Harris – Vice President of the United States
 Maya Harris – Lawyer, public policy advocate, and television commentator
 Pramila Jayapal – U.S. Representative from Washington
 Raja Krishnamoorthi – U.S. Representative from Illinois
 Nimi McConigley – Former U.S. Representative from Wyoming
 Visvanathan Rudrakumaran - Prime Minister of the Transnational Government of Tamil Eelam
 Sri Srinivasan – United States circuit judge
 Savita Vaidhyanathan – Politician, former mayor of Cupertino

Religion
 Ananda Coomaraswamy – Philosopher & Historian
 John Prabhudoss - Current Chairman of the Federation of Indian American Christian Organizations (FIACONA)

Sports
 Vijay Amritraj – Indian-American tennis player and commentator

References

Further reading
 
 Narayanan, Vasudha, "Tamils" in 
 
 Underwood, Kelsey Clark. "Image and Identity: Tamils' Migration to the United States." Papers Kroeber Anthropological Society (1986): 65+

 
Asian-American society
Tamil
South Asian American
T
America